ROPA may refer to:

 Reception of Oocytes from Partner, an IVF technique
 Regional Orchestra Players' Association, see International Conference of Symphony and Opera Musicians
 Representation of the People Act, a United Kingdom legislation

See also
 Ropa (disambiguation)